Gerald Click "Click" Schreck (March 8, 1939 – April 2, 2022) was an American sailor and Olympic champion. He competed at the 1968 Summer Olympics in Mexico City, where he received a gold medal in the Dragon class as crew member (with George Friedrichs and Barton Jahncke) on the boat Williwaw.

Born in Pensacola, Florida, Schreck worked as a sailmaker. He died on April 2, 2022 in Pensacola at the age of 83.

See also
 List of Olympic medalists in Dragon class sailing

References

External links
 
 
 

1939 births
2022 deaths
American male sailors (sport)
Sailors at the 1968 Summer Olympics – Dragon
Olympic gold medalists for the United States in sailing
Medalists at the 1968 Summer Olympics
Sportspeople from Pensacola, Florida